Juan Vicente Pérez Mora (born 27 May 1909) is a Venezuelan supercentenarian who, at the age of , is the world's oldest verified living man following the death of Spain's Saturnino de la Fuente García on 18 January 2022. He is the last living man verified to have been born in the 1900s decade.

Biography 
Pérez was born on 27 May 1909 in El Cobre, Venezuela as the ninth child of Euquitio Pérez and Edelmira Mora. In his early youth, his family moved to Los Paujiles in San José de Bolívar, Táchira to work in agriculture. He mainly worked in harvesting sugar cane and coffee. He became literate from a book handed to him by his teacher. In 1938, he married Ediofina del Rosario García (1916–1997), and they had six sons and five daughters in total, the first of whom was born in Los Paujiles.

At the age of 31, he and his wife moved to Caricuena to buy a farm to work alongside his brother Miguel Arcángel, and the rest of his children were born here. He became the sheriff of Caricuena in 1948, and in 1967, sold his farmland in Caricuena to buy property in San José de Bolívar, where he still resides.

As of his 111th birthday in May 2020, six of his children (three daughters and three sons) were still living. He has 41 grandchildren, 18 great-grandchildren, and 12 great-great-grandchildren.

Health and longevity 
Pérez began to use a wheelchair in 2007, aged 98.

On 18 January 2022, upon the death of Saturnino de la Fuente García of Spain, Pérez became the world's oldest man, and was validated by Guinness World Records, along with the Gerontology Research Group, on 4 February 2022, being announced on 17 May. It was reported that he lacked any notable health issues.

On his 113th birthday on 27 May 2022, he partook in a large celebration with his family, attended by many members of the community. He credits his longevity to working hard, praying the rosary twice a day, and drinking a glass of aguardiente every day.

On 1 June 2022, Pérez became the last surviving man verified to have been born before 1910, following the death of Italian-Brazilian Delio Venturotti (25 October 1909 – 1 June 2022).

See also
List of the oldest people by country
List of the verified oldest people

References

External links 
  (Family page)

1909 births
Living people
Men supercentenarians
Venezuelan centenarians